Massachusetts Innovation & Technology Exchange (MITX) is a nonprofit industry organization focused on the web and mobile. It is one of New England's main Internet business and marketing associations.

The organization was founded by Larry Weber and Michael Barron in 1996 to help marketers understand how digital technologies are converging and impacting the traditional and non-traditional marketing and media landscape.
MITX aims to help member companies recognize future trends, and to provide education on how to best take advantage of opportunities those impacts and trends represent. For this, MITX offers educational programming for businesses and individuals to explore trends and provide networking opportunities and initiatives to cultivate future leaders. Its most prominent events are the annual marketing mash-up FutureM, the MITX Interactive Awards, and the MITX Innovation Awards.

MITX also created the MITX Future Leaders Group, is part of the Mass Tech Hub Collaborative, a group of local organizations working to promote and grow the high tech sector in Massachusetts, and is the parent organization of BIMA, the Boston Interactive Media Association. In 2010, Debi Kleiman was appointed president of MITX. In 2014, Amy Quigley was appointed president of MITX.

MITX connects 250 member companies representing more than 7,500 professionals.

References

External links 
 

Organizations based in Massachusetts
Communications in Massachusetts